Ayo Ayo Municipality is the third municipal section of the Aroma Province in the  La Paz Department, Bolivia. Its seat is Ayo Ayo.

References 

 Instituto Nacional de Estadística de Bolivia

Municipalities of La Paz Department (Bolivia)